Zrinjevac may mean:

 Zrinjevac (Mostar), a central park in Mostar, Bosnia and Herzegovina
 Zrinjevac (Osijek), a park in Osijek, Croatia
 Nikola Šubić Zrinski Square (AKA Zrinjevac), a park and square in Zagreb, Croatia